The New Mexico Public Regulation Commission [PRC] is a regulatory authority in New Mexico charged with the responsibility of seeing that utility customers have "fair and reasonable rates, and to assure reasonable and adequate services to the public as provided by law."   The PRC regulates the insurance industry in New Mexico through its Division of Insurance, appointing an Insurance Superintendent who is a PRC employee having independent statutory powers.  The PRC also has responsibility for motor carrier regulation, the State Fire Marshal's Office, the Firefighter Training Academy, Pipeline Safety and the registration of all corporations and limited liability companies doing business in New Mexico.

On July 1, 2013, the Insurance Division separated from the Public Regulation Commission and became an independent agency.

The five PRC Commissioners are elected by district.  As of January 2021, the members of the commission are:

List of Public Regulation Commissioners

Notes

See also
 List of company registers

References

External links
 Official website

Public Regulation Commission
Public utilities commissions of the United States